Franco Gaetano Scoca (born 7 January 1935 in Rome) is an Italian lawyer and professor.

Books
Attività privata e potere amministrativo. Il modello della dichiarazione di inizio attività, Giappichelli Editore
Manuale di Diritto Amministrativo, Giappichelli Editore
La pubblica Amministrazione e la sua azione, Giappichelli Editore
I servizi pubblici locali, Giappichelli Editore
Accordi amministrativi tra provvedimenti e contratti, Giappichelli Editore
Diritto Amministrativo 2011, Giappichelli Editore
La rivista nel diritto, Giappichello Editore
Una giustizia per la pubblica amministrazione, Giappichelli Editore
Giustizia Amministrativa, Giappichelli Editore

References

20th-century Italian lawyers
1935 births
Living people
Academic staff of the D'Annunzio University of Chieti–Pescara